Iván Jaime Pajuelo (born 26 September 2000) is a Spanish footballer who plays for Famalicão as a central midfielder.

Club career

Málaga
Born in Málaga, Andalusia, Jaime joined Málaga CF's youth setup in 2011. He made his senior debut with the reserves on 26 November 2017, coming on as a first-half substitute in a 1–0 Tercera División away win against Villacarrillo CF.

On 11 September 2018, fifteen days shy of his 18th birthday, Jaime made his first-team debut by replacing fellow debutant Abdel Abqar in a 1–2 home loss against UD Almería for the season's Copa del Rey. He scored his first senior goal on 25 November, netting the opener or the B's through a penalty kick in a 2–1 home defeat of Atlético Sanluqueño CF in the Segunda División B championship.

On 28 February 2019, Jaime renewed his contract with the Blanquiazules until 2022. He made his Segunda División debut on 12 June of the following year, replacing fellow youth graduate Luis Muñoz late into a 1–3 home loss against SD Huesca.

Famalicão
On 23 September 2020, Jaime moved abroad and signed a five-year contract with Portuguese Primeira Liga side F.C. Famalicão. He scored his first professional goal the following 4 April, netting his team's second in a 2–0 home win over F.C. Paços de Ferreira; late in the month, he scored a brace in a 3–0 success at Gil Vicente F.C.

References

External links

2000 births
Living people
Footballers from Málaga
Spanish footballers
Footballers from Andalusia
Association football midfielders
Segunda División players
Segunda División B players
Tercera División players
Atlético Malagueño players
Málaga CF players
Primeira Liga players
F.C. Famalicão players
Spain youth international footballers
Spanish expatriate footballers
Spanish expatriate sportspeople in Portugal
Expatriate footballers in Portugal